"There, There, My Dear" is a song by English pop band Dexys Midnight Runners, released in June 1980 as the second and final single from their debut album Searching for the Young Soul Rebels. It peaked at number 7 on the UK Singles Chart.

Lyrics 
The song is an open letter to someone called Robin, who signifies the dishonest music scene. First all, the writer questions the fact that he says he is "anti-fashion", but continues to wear fashionable clothes instead of, for example, flares which were outdated. The writer then alludes to the fact that whilst Robin can quote numerous philosophical and artistic people (Cabaret, Isaiah Berlin, William S. Burroughs, J. G. Ballard, Marcel Duchamp, Simone de Beauvoir, Jack Kerouac, Søren Kierkegaard and Michael Rennie) he doesn't actually these works or quotes. The writer then questions whether Robin actually like Frank Sinatra, implying that Robin says he loves Sinatra but actually can't name many of his songs and the writer is saying that he is a poseur and a fake. 

The writer then wonders how he can be so happy and calls him a "dumb dumb patriot" as he seems to ignore all the unhappiness and unrest around him. He then says that "the only way to change things is to shoot men who arrange things". In an interview in 2001, Kevin Rowland said he wasn't proud of that lyric as "I don't feel that way now". The writer then says that he would listen to Robin's record collection but "I'd only waste three valuable minutes of my life with your insincerity". 

Then, now towards the end of the song, there are the lyrics "I've been searching for the young soul rebels", which inspired the album's title. The writer is saying that amidst the discord of the music scene, with post-punk, ska, pop, disco, etc, the writer wants to find harmony and integrity in all of this and Robin is someone who only likes what is cool and popular at that moment. The writer then alludes to the idea that all honesty has been driven out of the music business and has been left with fakery. On later releases of the album, the song ends with Rowland singing unaccompanied the chorus of the 1969 Lee Dorsey song "Everything I Do Gonh Be Funky (From Now On)".

Kevin Rowland later explained that "It's an angry song. In the lyrics, I'm addressing 'Robin,' but he was the personification of a certain type of middle-class musician in NME, quoting Kerouac and Burroughs and all these authors I'd never read.""

In the liner notes of Searching for the Young Soul Rebels, the song title is followed by the line "P.S. Old clothes do not make a tortured artist".

Reception
Reviewing the song for Smash Hits, David Hepworth wrote "Dexy's go out on a limb with their crucial follow up, Kevin Rowland delivering the vocal from the very lip of chaos while the horns dig in and hold the rhythm down". The song "pays no attention to any kind of form and just weaves all over the shop; the only real hook is the way he rrrrolls his rrrrrs every now and again". Reviewing retrospectively for Freaky Trigger, Peter Baran wrote "Attacking pretension whilst being fantastically pretentious, looking for a new music by aping a type of soul which had drifted out. All of which is made palatable by this overwhelming force of personality and energetic drive that runs through There, There, My Dear". Stewart Mason for AllMusic wrote "The follow-up to the UK number one single "Geno," "There, There, My Dear" is an even better song, perhaps the best of Dexy's Midnight Runners' entire career", describing it as "even catchier and more soulful" and that "it's the lyrics that make the song".

B-side 
The B-side is a cover of "The Horse", an instrumental soul song written by Jesse James which was first released by Cliff Nobles and Company in 1968. Dexys Midnight Runner's cover is a sped up version that removes most of the original soul. Between 1979 and 1980, the band regularly used it as a show-opener.

Charts

References

1980 singles
1980 songs
Songs written by Kevin Rowland
Dexys Midnight Runners songs
Song recordings produced by Pete Wingfield